Wild yam is a common name for several plants and may refer to:

 Dioscorea dregeana, native to southern Africa
 Dioscorea japonica, native to eastern Asia
 Dioscorea villosa, native to eastern North America